Marmora's warbler (Curruca sarda) is a typical warbler in the Sylviidae family. The specific sarda is a Latin feminine form for a person from Sardinia.

It breeds on Mediterranean islands, typically including Corsica and Sardinia. The smaller Balearic Islands bird is increasingly given specific status as Balearic warbler, Curruca balearica. These two seem to form a superspecies which in turn groups with Tristram's warbler and the Dartford warbler. They are generally resident but some birds migrate south to winter in north Africa. They are rare vagrants to northern and western Europe.

These are small, long tailed, large-headed birds, overall very similar to their close relatives in the Dartford warbler group. Marmora's warblers are grey above and below, lacking the brick-red underparts of the Dartford warbler. Adult males have darker patches on the forehead and between the eye and the pointed bill. The legs and iris are red. The song is a fast rattle. Immature birds can be confused with young Dartford warblers, which are also grey below, but Marmora's have a paler throat. Their iris is dark.

These small passerine birds are found in open country with thorny bushes and heather. 3-5 eggs are laid in a nest in a bush. Like most warblers, they are insectivorous.

This bird is named after the Italian naturalist Alberto della Marmora.

References

External links

Marmora's warbler
Birds of Southern Europe
Fauna of Corsica
Fauna of Sardinia
Birds of North Africa
Marmora's warbler